Sredny Kurchali (Yuq̇era-Kurçala)  is a rural locality (a selo) in Vedensky District, Chechnya.

Administrative and municipal status 
Municipally, Sredny Kurchali is incorporated into Kurchalinskoye rural settlement. It is one of the six settlements included in it.

Geography 

Sredny Kurchali is located on the right bank of the Gums River.

The nearest settlements to Sredny Kurchali are Nizhny Kurchali in the north-west, Bas-Gordali in the north-east, Tazen-Kala in the south, Tsentaroy and Verkhny Kurchali in the south-east, Ersenoy in the south-west, and Mesedoy in the west.

History 
In 1944, after the genocide and deportation of the Chechen and Ingush people and the Chechen-Ingush ASSR was abolished, the village of Sredny Kurchali was renamed to Kolob, and settled by people from the neighboring republic of Dagestan. From 1944 to 1957, it was a part of the Vedensky District of the Dagestan ASSR.

In 1958, after the Vaynakh people returned and the Chechen-Ingush ASSR was restored, the village regained its old Chechen name, Sredny Kurchali.

Population 
 1990 Census: 178
 2002 Census: 566
 2010 Census: 92
 2019 estimate: ?

According to the results of the 2010 Census, the majority of residents of Sredny Kurchali were ethnic Chechens.

References 

Rural localities in Vedensky District